Persiaran Jubli Emas, Federal Route 179, is a federal road in Perlis, Malaysia.

Features

At most sections, the Federal Route 179 was built under the JKR R5 road standard, allowing maximum speed limit of up to 90 km/h.

List of junctions and towns

References

Malaysian Federal Roads
Roads in Perlis